Saint-Hilaire-Cusson-la-Valmitte is a commune in the Loire department in central France.

See also
Communes of the Loire department

References

Sainthilairecussonlavalmitte